Preston Geren may refer to: 

Preston Geren Sr., American architect and engineer
Preston Geren Jr., American architect and son of Preston Geren Sr.
Preston "Pete" Geren III, American politician and son of Preston Geren Jr.